Geoffrey Lyons is a politician.

Geoffrey Lyons may also refer to:

Geoffrey Lyons, High Sheriff of King's County in 1693
Geoffrey Lyons, character in The Hound of the Baskervilles (1983 film)
Jeffrey S. Lyons (1939 or 1940–2015),  Toronto lawyer, lobbyist, and community activist.
Jeffrey Lyons (1944),  American television and film critic
Tahir Faridi Qawwal, leader of Canadian-American Qawwali band Fanna-Fi-Allah, who changed his name from Geoffrey Lyons upon converting to Islam